Superfuzz Bigmuff Plus Early Singles is a compilation album by the grunge band Mudhoney. The album contains the entire Superfuzz Bigmuff EP, the A-sides and B-sides of 2 singles, and 2 covers from split singles with Sonic Youth and The Dicks. It was released by Sub Pop Records in October 1990. The album is named after the Electro-Harmonix Big Muff Pi and the Univox Super-Fuzz fuzzboxes, (the title also being a play on words) which gave the band their signature dirty sound.

"Touch Me I'm Sick" was Mudhoney's first single, and one of the first singles ever released by Sub Pop; "Sweet Young Thing Ain't Sweet No More" was the B-side.
"You Got It (Keep It Outta My Face)" was released as a single in 1989; "Burn It Clean" was the B-side.
"Hate the Police" is a cover of a song by The Dicks.
"Halloween" is a cover of a Sonic Youth song, originally recorded for the split single between the two bands, on which Sonic Youth played "Touch Me I'm Sick."
The last 6 tracks on the album are from Mudhoney's debut EP Superfuzz Bigmuff.

In 2005 the album was performed live in its entirety as part of the All Tomorrow's Parties-curated Don't Look Back series.

Track listing
All tracks by Mudhoney unless otherwise noted.

"Touch Me I'm Sick" – 2:35
"Sweet Young Thing Ain't Sweet No More" – 3:46
"Hate the Police" (The Dicks cover) – 2:08
"Burn It Clean" – 3:00
"You Got It (Keep It Outta My Face)" – 2:53
"Halloween" (Sonic Youth cover) – 6:12
"No One Has" – 3:26
"If I Think" – 3:37
"In 'n' Out of Grace" – 5:28
"Need" – 3:00
"Chain That Door" – 1:51
"Mudride" – 5:43

References

Mudhoney albums
1990 compilation albums
Grunge compilation albums
Sub Pop compilation albums
Albums produced by Jack Endino